We and Our Cadillac is the debut album by Swedish beat group Hep Stars, released in September 1965. It was highly anticipated by fans, and succeeded their earlier hit singles, which turned Hep Stars into one of Sweden's top acts. It appeared on shows such as Drop-In and having three songs on Kvällstoppen simultaneously, a feat never achieved before. In Sweden alone, the Hep Stars had accumulated an ever-growing female fanbase, just like the Beatles did with Beatlemania just two years prior.

The album contains Benny Andersson's first original composition, "No Response", which was written by him after the band was criticised by contemporary Swedish acts such as Tages for not being able to write original material. The song, clocking in at 1:37, it is the shortest track on the album. Despite this, It was issued as a single in September, and reached number 2 on Kvällstoppen shortly thereafter. However, in later interviews, Andersson has considered it imperfect and a "rush-job".

In contrast to their later works, guitarist Janne Frisk shares lead vocal duties with Svenne Hedlund on 4 of the album's 12 tracks. This is due to the fact that Frisk was the group's lead singer and guitarist up until Hedlund's invitation to the band in mid-1964. Tracks on the album includes a re-recorded version of their hit song "Cadillac", which would go on to be heavily associated with the group, and become one of their signature songs. It became the first album release on the label, and the majority of tracks were cut on a three-track recorder.

Track listing

Personnel 
Hep Stars
 Svenne Hedlund – lead and backing vocals
 Janne Frisk – guitar, backing vocals, lead vocals on "Be My Baby", "Send Me Some Lovin'", "Sweet Little Sixteen" and "Then She (He) Kissed Me"
 Benny Andersson – piano, organ, backing vocals (except "Kana Kapila" and "I Got A Woman")
 Lennart Hegland – bass guitar, backing vocals
 Christer Petterson – drums, backing vocals, lead vocals on "Bird Dog"
Hans Östlund – organ on "Kana Kapila" and "I Got A Woman"

Other personnel

 Lennart Fernholm – bass guitar 
 Gert Palmcrantz – producer
 Anders Ericsson – producer
 Robert Meyer – photography

References

External links 
 thehepstars.se – the Hep Stars official website

1965 debut albums
Hep Stars albums